SpeechSchool.TV is an online speech training service based in New Zealand and the United Kingdom. It provides a subscription based Internet TV channel to provide a Standard English accent training service to students worldwide.  It was founded in 2009 for the purpose of teaching the English accent to foreign students and others who were interested in improving their accent. It has won the Technium Challenge Award for New Zealand.

The company provides two different courses in speech training: 'The Master Speaker English Accent Programme', which is focused on accent reduction to help develop clear English speaking skills without mumbling or stuttering; the other is 'The Master Communicator Programme'  to help develop presentation, confidence, and public speaking skills.

References

New Zealand educational websites
Education companies of New Zealand
Education companies of the United Kingdom
Public speaking organizations